Cyana unipunctata is a moth of the family Erebidae. It was described by Henry John Elwes in 1890. It is found in Japan.

References

Cyana
Moths described in 1890